is a Japanese manga artist and character designer. He designed the characters for Xenogears, Xenosaga Episode I: Der Wille zur Macht and Xenoblade Chronicles X, as well as character concept design for the anime Key the Metal Idol. He wrote the manga for Ruin Explorers which was made into an OVA in 1995.

Works

Manga

Video games

Anime

Notes

References

External links
  
 

1970 births
Japanese artists
Living people
Manga artists
Video game artists